Haugesund Teater is a theatre based in Haugesund, Norway and is regional theatre for Nord-Rogaland. The theatre was established in 1986.

Maryon Eilertsen served as theatre director from 1993 to 1995. Birgit Amalie Nilssen was theatre director from 2005 to 2014.

References

 

Theatres in Norway
Haugesund
Culture in Rogaland
1986 establishments in Norway